Pediocactus peeblesianus is a rare species of cactus known by the common names Navajo pincushion cactus. It is endemic to the state of Arizona in the United States. The species is named after the Arizona botanist Robert Hibbs Peebles.

Description
This petite cactus grows up to 6.5 centimeters tall by about 5.5 wide. It is grayish green in color and generally spherical or egg-shaped. Sometimes only the top is visible above the soil and the whole cactus body may shrink and disappear under the soil in dry times. Each circular, hairy areole on the surface of the cactus has a few spines, the longest of which may exceed 2 centimeters in length. The spines are mostly corky and flexible but have hard tips and are white or dull in color. The yellowish flowers are up to 2.5 centimeters wide. The fruit is green, ripening reddish, and reaches about a centimeter long.

Subspecies
This species is divided into two subspecies, but these are sometimes referred to as varieties.  One subspecies of the plant is federally listed as an endangered species of the U.S.

Habitat
The species occurs in desert habitat and the transition to Great Basin grassland habitat. It grows in sandy soil and among rocks.  Drought has been a significant threat to this cactus in recent years. The Peebles Navajo cactus

References

External links
 
 USDA Plants Profile

Cacti of the United States
Flora of Arizona
Endemic flora of the United States
Plants described in 1962
peeblesianus
Taxa named by Léon Croizat